Kiko Kostadinov (born 1989) is a Bulgarian fashion designer based in London. He currently is the creative director of his eponymous label as well as British heritage brand Mackintosh's premium line Mackintosh 0001. Kostadinov's work is centered on modern-day uniform and contemporary workwear.

Early life 
Kostadinov was born in Bulgaria, but emigrated to London at the age of 16. His father was a construction worker, while his mother was a childcare worker and cleaning lady. During his upbringing in Bulgaria, Kostadinov's only exposure to arts and culture was receiving clothes from his uncle who resided in London. Although he was interested in his own personal style, Kostadinov was never exposed to fashion in Bulgaria. Kostadinov's clothing is greatly influenced by fellow designer Yohji Yamamoto. He is also inspired by designers Rick Owens and Christopher Kane

Education 
Kostadinov obtained a degree in information technology before deciding to pursue fashion. He initially enrolled in a foundation course at London College of Fashion, but realized he wanted to attend Central Saint Martins. After being rejected from Central Saint Martins, Kostadinov would assist a number of menswear designers and stylists, such as Aitor Throup, Nicola Formichetti, and Stephan Mann. He was accepted to Central Saint Martins' B.A. fashion design and marketing program two years later. Kostadinov attempted to transfer to the school's menswear program many times, but was repeatedly refused.

Kostadinov returned to Central Saint Martins for his master's degree in fashion. During his education, Kostadinov created commission pieces made from Stüssy clothing for an editorial featured in Clash magazine. Although the clothing was bespoke and never intended to be sold, Stüssy reached out to him to collaborate on a capsule collection to celebrate their 35th anniversary in 2015. Each piece was hand made and took 1–2 days to produce through deconstruction and cut-and-sew. He would use the money earned from the sales to continue his education. Later that year he would release another collection with Stüssy to be sold by Dover Street Market.

Career 
Kostadinov experienced little transition from schooling to the runway. After graduating from his master's program in 2016, he would immediately be funded by the British Fashion Council's NEWGEN initiative. In January 2017, he presented his debut collection, characterized by meticulously engineered garments with highly functional cuts and finishes. This theme would pervade his later work.

In November 2017, Kostadinov was appointed as creative director of Mackintosh 0001, a fashion focused offshoot of outerwear brand Mackintosh. Kostadinov's creative direction would be inspired by Italian art movement Arte Povera, characterized by an emphasis on traditional product and material.

Kostadinov partnered with Japanese brand ASICS to produce footwear for his eponymous label's Spring/Summer 2018 collection. The partnership would continue for his Autumn/Winter 2018 collection. In 2018, Kostadinov would also collaborate with Camper to create his own rendition of three of the brand's hiking boots.

In the fall of 2018, Kostadinov introduced a womenswear line to be led by Laura and Deanna Fanning, who had graduated from Central Saint Martins' master program 7 months prior.

In 2019, Kostadinov was a semifinalist for the LVMH Prize for Young Designers which awards winners a 300,000 euro grant along with 12 months of support from the LVMH Group. However he did not progress beyond the semifinalist level.

References

1987 births
Living people
Bulgarian expatriates in the United Kingdom
Bulgarian fashion designers
English fashion designers
Menswear designers